The women's 3000 metres walk event  at the 1990 European Athletics Indoor Championships was held in Kelvin Hall on 3 and 4 March.

Medalists

Results

Heats
First 4 from each heat (Q) and the next 4 fastest (q) qualified for the final.

Final

References

Racewalking at the European Athletics Indoor Championships
3000
1990 in women's athletics